Pipob On-Mo (born 22 April 1979) is a Thai retired professional footballer who plays as a striker.

Club career

Pipob On-Mo began his career in 2000 with BEC Tero Sasana, and won two league titles with the club. Additionally, the club reached the AFC Champions League final in 2003, but Pipob was not used. In 2007, Pipob signed with Chonburi. In his first season at Chonburi, he won another title and was voted Player of the Year. In 2019 Pipob accepted an offer to join the club's first-team coaching staff at Chonburi after his retirement at the end of the 2018 season.

International career
Although he played for the Thailand U-17's and won the AFC U-17 Championships with them in 1998, he did not debut for the senior team until 2005. He played in the 2012 AFF Suzuki Cup as a substitute. He later retired from the national team.

International

Managerial statistics

Honours

Player

Club
BEC Tero Sasana
 Thai Premier League 
  Champions (2) : 2000, 2001-02
 Thai FA Cup 
   Winner (1) : 2000
 Kor Royal Cup 
   Winner (1) : 2001

Chonburi 
 Thai Premier League
  Champions (1) : 2007
 Thai FA Cup 
  Winners (1) : 2010
 Kor Royal Cup 
  Winners (4) : 2008, 2009, 2010, 2011

International
Thailand U-17
 AFC U-17 Championship 
  Winners (1) : 1998

References

External links
 Profile at Goal

1979 births
Living people
Pipob On-Mo
Pipob On-Mo
Association football forwards
Pipob On-Mo
Pipob On-Mo
Pipob On-Mo
Pipob On-Mo